Jethro Mohlala, commonly known as Lovers Mohlala, (born 26 April 1975) is a South African former footballer who played professionally as a left-fullback in Greece and South Africa. He earned nine caps for the South African national team, and was named to the squad for the 2002 COSAFA Cup.

Career
Born in Alexandra, Mohlala turned professional with Wits University in 1992. After five seasons with Wits, he joined Mamelodi Sundowns. Following a failed move to F.C. Copenhagen, Mohlala forced a move to AmaZulu. Shortly after, he re-signed with Wits, before moving to Jomo Cosmos.

In January 2004, Mohlala signed with Superleague Greece side Aris Thessaloniki, but he made just two league appearances for the club before returning to South Africa six months later. He would play for Jomo Cosmos, Silver Stars, Moroka Swallows, AmaZulu and Black Leopards before retiring in 2009.

Mohlala represented South Africa at all age levels. He made his senior debut in a 1999 COSAFA Cup match against Botswana.

References 

1976 births
Living people
South African soccer players
South Africa international soccer players
Bidvest Wits F.C. players
Mamelodi Sundowns F.C. players
Jomo Cosmos F.C. players
AmaZulu F.C. players
Platinum Stars F.C. players
Moroka Swallows F.C. players
Black Leopards F.C. players
Aris Thessaloniki F.C. players
Association football defenders